Learning Tools Interoperability (LTI) is an education technology specification developed by the IMS Global Learning Consortium. It specifies a method for a learning system to invoke and to communicate with external systems. In the current version of the specification, v1.3, this is done using OAuth2, OpenID Connect, and JSON Web Tokens. For example, a Learning Management System (LMS) may use LTI to host course content and tools provided by external, third-party systems on a web site, without requiring a learner to log in separately on the external systems, with information about the learner and the learning context shared by the LMS with the external systems.

History
 Learning Tools Interoperability, then called BasicLTI, originated in 2008 as a Google Summer of Code project developed by Jordi Piguillem under the mentorship of Charles Severance and Marc Alier.
In June 2010 LTI v1.0 was finalized.
In August 2012, LTI v1.1 added the ability for the external tool to pass grades back to the invoking system.
In January 2014, LTI v2.0 was released, providing REST-based two-way communication between the external tool and the invoking platform. At the same time, a subset of v2.0 was released as v1.2, as a stepping stone between v1.1 and v2.0.
Due to complexity, adoption of LTI v1.2 and v2.0 was slow, and IMS GLC subsequently declared them to be "legacy" specifications, not in the recommended upgrade path from LTI v1.1, citing security concerns.
 In May 2019, the IMS Security Framework and LTI v1.3 were published, based on OAuth2, OpenID Connect, and JWT. LTI v1.0, v1.1, v1.2 and v2.0 were all deprecated.

Adoption
LTI has been adopted by many large educational content providers, including Pearson and McGraw Hill. 
 

 
Popular Learning Management Systems, such as D2L Brightspace, Instructure Canvas, Blackboard, BenchPrep, LAMS, OpenLearning, Sakai, Moodle, iTeach and Open edX also support LTI.

References

External links 
 Dr. Chuck's Blog: Teaching, Learning, Technology, Standards, Interoperability, etc., "Connecting IMS Learning Tools Interoperability and SAML"
 eLearning Industry, "Why Learning Tool Interoperability Should Be Part Of Your eLearning Application"
 Blackboard Help, "Learning Tools Interoperability"
 Moodle documentation, "LTI and Moodle"

Software architecture
Web 2.0 neologisms